Scott Alexander Gladman Pollock (born 12 March 2001) is an English professional footballer who plays as a midfielder for Yeovil Town.

Career
Pollock began his career with Northampton Town, featuring in the club's youth Football & Education Programme having joined as an under-14. In 2017, Pollock began playing for the then Sunday League team Hashtag United after winning their nationwide academy competition in May. He subsequently appeared at the EE Wembley Cup later that year, a competition in which he won man of the match and was subsequently handed a trial at Crystal Palace. They didn't sign Pollock though, stating he was "too slight".

Pollock, before playing for Hashtag United, had a trial with Leicester City.

On 14 September 2018, Pollock signed a two year contract with Northampton Town. Two weeks later, he was selected as a substitute in a League Two fixture against Mansfield Town. In January 2019, Pollock was sent out on loan to St Neots Town. He was recalled following two appearances. Pollock subsequently made his professional league debut on 19 January against Cambridge United. In the succeeding February, Pollock rejoined St Neots Town on loan. He was again recalled in April after seven games.

Pollock started in League Two for the first time on 13 April as Northampton drew 1–1 with Mansfield Town. He assisted Sam Foley's goal.

On 22 October 2019, Pollock netted his first goal in a 2–0 away win over Carlisle United; scoring in the 51st minute.

On 26 February 2022, Pollock joined National League North side Boston United on a one-month loan deal. He made his debut that day and opened the scoring just ten minutes in as his side defeated Kettering Town 3–2. He was recalled in March 2022.

In June 2022, following his release from Northampton Town, Pollock joined Boston United on a permanent basis.

On 6 March 2023, Pollock signed with Yeovil Town in the National League.

Career statistics
.

Notes

Honours
Individual
Northampton Town Young Player of the Season: 2018–19
EFL League Two Apprentice of the Year: 2020

References

External links

2001 births
Living people
Footballers from Northampton
English footballers
Association football midfielders
Hashtag United F.C. players
Northampton Town F.C. players
St Neots Town F.C. players
Boston United F.C. players
Yeovil Town F.C. players
Southern Football League players
English Football League players
National League (English football) players